Emily Newton Barto (1896–1968) was an American children's book illustrator, writer, craftsperson, writer, and designer. She was known for painting murals at Fordham Hospital in New York City, as a Federal Arts Project participant.

Biography 
Emily Barto was born in 1896 in Patchogue, New York (or possibly Greenport). In 1935, as reported in the New York Times, Barto was one of six artists selected by the Municipal Art Commission to paint murals for hospitals.

Her sketchbook is in the collection of the Archives of American Art at the Smithsonian Institution.

Works 
 Animal Tales, mural, Fordham Hospital, New York

References

External links 
 New York WPA Artist Emily Barto Painting, 1930

1896 births
1968 deaths
20th-century American painters
American women painters
American muralists
Federal Art Project artists
Painters from New York (state)
American women illustrators
American illustrators
People from Patchogue, New York
People from Greenport, Suffolk County, New York
20th-century American women artists
Women muralists